Cwmyoy is an extensive rural parish in Monmouthshire, Wales ( for the valley and parish,  for the village). The standard Welsh name is Cwm Iau or Cwm-iau. In the Gwentian dialect of Welsh that was spoken here until the late 1800s, the name was pronounced as Cwm Iou ('ou', also spelt informally 'oi', for standard 'au' is a common feature of south Wales Welsh). The 'English' name is in fact this local dialect form in a more English spelling. The name of the valley probably originates from the Welsh word iau meaning yoke, in reference to the shape of the hill surrounding it.

It is within the Brecon Beacons National Park, in an upland location just below the broad ridge of Hatterrall Hill, which carries the Wales–England border and Offa's Dyke Path.

The parish
In 1893, an area in the neighbouring valley of the Grwyne Fawr, known in Welsh as Ffwddog and in English as the Fothock, which had been an exclave of Herefordshire, was transferred into the parish.

Local amenities
The Cwmyoy area is popular for hillwalking and pony trekking. Llanthony Priory, Capel-y-ffin and Gospel Pass are all accessed by passing below Cwmyoy village.

Cwmyoy also has a small village hall which is run as a registered charity.

St Martin's Church

Cwmyoy is best known for St Martin's Church, which has been called the "most crooked church in Great Britain." The church is a stone parish church standing on a steep hillside on the east side of the valley and subject to slippage. The church chancel has been described as a remarkable example of a "weeping chancel", where the nave represents Christ's body and the deflected chancel his head fallen sideways in death. At Cwmyoy not only the axis but the whole chancel slews sideways. Hando (1958) calls it "the Church below the Landslide".

References

External links

The Cistercian Way info on Cwmyoy
Descriptive article on the area by Simon Jenkins
Numerous photos of the church at flickr.com
A series of three photos at picasaweb.google.com
www.geograph.co.uk : photos of Cwmyoy and surrounding area

Villages in Monmouthshire
Black Mountains, Wales